The Browning BSS is a side by side double barrel shotgun made by Browning from 1971–1983.

References

Double-barreled shotguns